Utuhina  is a suburb of Rotorua in the Bay of Plenty Region of New Zealand's North Island.

Demographics

Utuhina had a population of 1,491 at the 2018 New Zealand census, an increase of 114 people (8.3%) since the 2013 census, and an increase of 87 people (6.2%) since the 2006 census. There were 522 households, comprising 723 males and 768 females, giving a sex ratio of 0.94 males per female. The median age was 36.6 years (compared with 37.4 years nationally), with 315 people (21.1%) aged under 15 years, 327 (21.9%) aged 15 to 29, 651 (43.7%) aged 30 to 64, and 201 (13.5%) aged 65 or older.

Ethnicities were 56.7% European/Pākehā, 37.0% Māori, 7.8% Pacific peoples, 17.9% Asian, and 1.0% other ethnicities. People may identify with more than one ethnicity.

The percentage of people born overseas was 23.5, compared with 27.1% nationally.

Although some people chose not to answer the census's question about religious affiliation, 45.1% had no religion, 34.6% were Christian, 1.8% had Māori religious beliefs, 6.2% were Hindu, 0.2% were Muslim, 0.4% were Buddhist and 3.4% had other religions.

Of those at least 15 years old, 186 (15.8%) people had a bachelor's or higher degree, and 231 (19.6%) people had no formal qualifications. The median income was $27,300, compared with $31,800 nationally. 120 people (10.2%) earned over $70,000 compared to 17.2% nationally. The employment status of those at least 15 was that 585 (49.7%) people were employed full-time, 192 (16.3%) were part-time, and 66 (5.6%) were unemployed.

Marae

Mataatua Marae was established in the 1960s as a gathering place for the Tūhoe people.

Local Tuhoe had been calling for Māori Land Court to set aside land for a Tuhoe marae reservation in Rotorua. The land was ultimately made available by the Ngāti Whakaue people; the meeting hall Aroha a te Arawa was named in recognition of Tuhoe's gratitude for the gift of the land.

Families began living on the land from 1962, and Eastern Maori MP Paraone Reweti opened a community centre on the site in 1969.

In October 2020, the Government committed $3,996,258 from the Provincial Growth Fund to upgrade the marae and 7 others, creating 79 jobs.

Education

Two co-educational state primary schools are located in Utuhina.

References

Suburbs of Rotorua
Populated places in the Bay of Plenty Region